Anatólio Falé (1913–1980) was a Portuguese professor of music, musician and composer from Lagos. He is most associated with folk music. A road is named after him in his home town.

See also
List of Portuguese composers

References

Portuguese composers
Portuguese male composers
1913 births
1980 deaths
20th-century composers
20th-century male musicians